The 1993 Japan Series was the Nippon Professional Baseball (NPB) championship series for the 1993 season. It was the 44th Japan Series and featured the Pacific League champion Seibu Lions against the Central League champion Yakult Swallows. This was the fourth consecutive Japan Series appearance for Seibu and the second consecutive championship contested between the two clubs, with Seibu taking the crown the year before. Played at Seibu Lions Stadium and Meiji Jingu Stadium, the Swallows defeated the Lions four games to three in the best-of-seven series to win the franchise's 2nd Japan Series title. Yakult pitcher Kenjiro Kawasaki was named Most Valuable Player of the series. The series was played between October 23 and November 1 with home field advantage going to the Pacific League.

Summary

Matchups

Game 1

Game 2

Game 3

Game 4

Game 5

Game 6

Game 7

See also
1993 World Series

References

External links
 Nippon Professional Baseball—Official website (in English)

Japan Series
1993 Nippon Professional Baseball season
Tokyo Yakult Swallows
Seibu Lions